Paragorgopis maculata is a species of ulidiid or picture-winged fly in the genus Paragorgopis of the family Ulidiidae.

References

maculata
Insects described in 1893